The 1947 San Francisco State Gators football team represented San Francisco State College—now known as San Francisco State University—as a member of the Far Western Conference (FWC) during the 1947 college football season. Led by fifth-year head coach Dick Boyle, San Francisco State compiled an overall record of 2–5 with a mark of 1–3 in conference play, tying for fourth place in the FWC. For the season the team was outscored by its opponents 117 to 33. The Gators played home games at Cox Stadium in San Francisco.

Schedule

Notes

References

San Francisco State
San Francisco State Gators football seasons
San Francisco State Gators football